Peter Thaggard (born 1964) is a former Fijian international lawn bowler.

Bowls career
Thaggard has represented Fiji at the Commonwealth Games, in the fours event at the 1998 Commonwealth Games.

He won two medals at the Asia Pacific Bowls Championships in 1985 and 1995 respectively.

References

Fijian male bowls players
1964 births
Living people
Bowls players at the 1998 Commonwealth Games